Lenie 't Hart (born Leentje Godlieb) (born September 16, 1941 in Farmsum) is a Dutch animal caretaker and animal rights activist. In 1971, she founded the Seal Rehabilitation and Research Centre in Pieterburen, Groningen. Later she was forced to leave the center as she strongly resisted against new, scientifically-based policies about seal care and the current employees of the center as well as the government did not longer want to cooperate with her.

Seal rescue

't Hart started in 1971 with one lost seal in a tub in her own back-garden. In the beginning the care was only for seal puppies who had lost their mother, the "howlers", as a young seal pup can not survive without his mother.

In 2014 the people working at the Seal Rehabilitation Centre forced 't Hart to stop her activities at the centre, as she wouldn't accept the new scientifically based policy on treating injured seals and intervened too much with the people working there.

In the years after she had left, 't Hart and a few of her former colleagues have been subject in several criminal investigations by the Dutch authorities because they illegally captured seals and kept them at home under bad circumstances.

Sources

External links

 

1941 births
Living people
Keepers of animal sanctuaries
Dutch activists
Dutch women activists
People from Delfzijl